Kim Bong-jo (13 January 1946 – 8 March 2017) was a South Korean freestyle swimmer. He competed in two events at the 1964 Summer Olympics.

References

External links
 

1946 births
2017 deaths
South Korean male freestyle swimmers
Olympic swimmers of South Korea
Swimmers at the 1964 Summer Olympics